The 2013–14 Slovak Extraliga season was the 21st season of the Slovak Extraliga, the highest level of ice hockey in Slovakia.

Teams
The following teams are participating in the 2013–14 season. The HK Orange 20 is a project for preparation of the Slovakia junior ice hockey team for the IIHF World U20 Championship. The team do not play complete regular season and cannot promote to the playoffs or get relegated. First 8 teams in table after the regular season (56 games) will promote to the playoffs.

Regular season

Standings
Source: 

Key - GP: Games played, W: Wins, OTW/SOW: Overtime/Shootout wins, OTL/SOL: Overtime/Shootout losses, L: Losses, GF: Goals for, GA: Goals against, PTS: Points.

Statistics

Scoring leaders
Source: 

 
GP = Games played; G = Goals; A = Assists; Pts = Points; +/– = Plus/minus; PIM = Penalty minutes

Leading goaltenders
These are the leaders in GAA among goaltenders that have played at least 1200 minutes.

Source: 

GP = Games played; TOI = Time on ice (minutes); GA = Goals against; Sv% = Save percentage; GAA = Goals against average

Play-off
The seeding in Play-off is based on the ranking in Regular season. All Play-off rounds are played in the best-of-seven format, with the higher seeded team having the home advantage for the possible seventh game.

Playoff bracket

† Defending champion

Quarterfinals
Source:

(1) HC Košice vs. (8) MHC Mountfield

(2) HK Nitra vs. (7) HKm Zvolen

(3) HC '05 Banská Bystrica vs. (6) HK 36 Skalica

(4) ŠHK 37 Piešťany vs. (5) HK Poprad

Semifinals

(1) HC Košice vs. (4) ŠHK 37 Piešťany

(2) HK Nitra vs. (3) HC '05 Banská Bystrica

Finals

(1) HC Košice vs. (2) HK Nitra

Statistics

Scoring leaders
Source: 

 
GP = Games played; G = Goals; A = Assists; Pts = Points; +/– = Plus/minus; PIM = Penalty minutes

Relegation series
Source: 

Relegation series will be played between MsHK Žilina, the 10th team in regular season, and HC 46 Bardejov, the winner of 1.liga. The winner of best-of-seven series will play in Extraliga in 2014–15 season.

MsHK Žilina vs. HC 46 Bardejov

Attendance

Source:

Final rankings

References

External links
Official website
Season statistics

Slovak Extraliga seasons
3